Dial My Number may refer to:

Dial My Number, disco song by R. Bais, 1985
Dial My Number, disco song by The Back Bag, cover of original by R. Bais, 1986
Dial My Number, first solo album Pauli Carman, 1986
Dial My Number, by Carlene Davis, 1992 
"Dial My Number", R&B hit single Pauli Carman
"Dial My Number", song by Rick Astley from Hold Me in Your Arms
"Dial My Number", song by Sophie Ellis-Bextor from Make a Scene